Re-Entry is a streamliner dragster.

Built by Roger Lindwall, Re-Entry seems to have benefitted from his experience in hydroplane racing, featuring a semi-enclosed cockpit and enclosed engine and rear end, mated to a typical Top Fuel car's bicycle wheels, dropped axle, and zoomie pipes.  The body was all-aluminum.  Re-Entry was powered by a  hemi.

Re-Entry debuted at Cordova Dragway, Illinois, in 1966, where she turned in the first  pass for a rear-engined dragster.

Lindwall did not rebuild the car and quit drag racing.

Notes

Sources
Taylor, Thom.  "Beauty Beyond the Twilight Zone" in Hot Rod, April 2017, pp. 30–43.

1960s cars
Drag racing cars